Claudine Marie Claire Loquen (born 1965), known as Claudine Loquen [Klodin loʊkən], is a French painter in the naïve style.

Several of his works are held in French and foreign museums (Musée Daubigny in Auvers-sur-Oise, Musée international d'art naïf in Magog, Musée d'art spontané in Brussels).

Biography

Early life

Loquen is born in Sainte-Adresse (Normandy) on 22 February 1965. She studied at the Ecole des Beaux Arts of Le Havre.

Career

In 2003, her first exhibition took place in Café Les Deux Magots in Paris.

Colombe Anouilh, on 8 December 2014, awarded her the Jean Anouilh prize for her work on canvas Young women with wolves (Jeunes filles aux loups) presented at the Salon d'automne, in Paris. In 2021, still at the Salon d'Automne, she was awarded the Naive Art prize for a painting
In the shadow of the flowering maidens (A l'ombre des jeunes filles en fleurs).

From 2021, she presides over the Naive Art section at the Salon d'automne in Paris, bringing together some twenty artists from the naive art 
movement.

Selected exhibitions

Solo exhibitions
 2021 : Wolves, Les peintres du Marais Galery, Paris
 2019 : La maison de l'Etang, Louveciennes, France
 2019 : The ladies of the Andelys, Musée Nicolas Poussin, Les Andelys, France
 2018 : Galery Rollin, Rouen, France Rouen : l’univers onirique de Claudine Loquen à découvrir à la galerie Rollin
 2016 : As long as there are wolves, Museum of Spontaneous Art, Brussels, Belgium
 2011 : Singular portraits, Sénat, Pavillon Davioud, Le Jardin du Luxembourg, Paris
 2003 : Café Les Deux Magots, Paris

Group exhibitions
 2022 : National Art center Museum, Salon d'automne à Tokyo, Japon
 2019 : Société Nationale des Beaux-Arts, Caroussel du Louvre, Paris, France
 2019 : International Children's Art Museum, Salon d'automne, Xi'an, China
 2016 : National Art center Museum, Salon d'automne à Tokyo, Japon
 2016 : International Museum of Naive Art of Magog, Canada
 2012 : Hainan Museum, Salon d'automne, Haikou, China
 2011 : Museum of Spontaneous Art, Evere, Belgium
 2010 : Salon d'Automne, Grand Palais, Paris, France

Bibliography
 Frédérique-Anne Oudin (preface), 2020, Les oubliées, Tome 1, éditions La Grisette, 36 p 
 Luis Porquet (preface), 2018, Loquen, 18 p 
 Jean-Paul Gavard-Perret, (preface), 2011, Claudine Loquen, Portraits singuliers. Paris : éditions Lelivredart, 28 p
 HeleneCaroline Fournier, (preface), 2011, Sénat, Portraits singuliers, Claudine Loquen. Québec : Art Total Multimédia, 20 p 
 IIeana Cornea, (preface), textes de Sylvie Loquen, 2008, Claudine Loquen. éditions Lelivredart, 40 p 
 HeleneCaroline Fournier, (preface), 2008, Claudine Loquen. Québec : Art Total Multimedia
 Jean-Louis Redval (preface), 2004, Loquen, éditions Sémios, 44 p

Notes and references

External links

 Official website
 Ricochet.org
 BnF
 Art e Cultura

1965 births
Outsider artists
Feminist artists
Naïve painters
Collage artists
20th-century French painters
French women painters
People from Sainte-Adresse
20th-century French women artists
Women outsider artists
Living people